Sa'adatu Kande Balarabe was a Nigerian politician from Kano State. She was among a trio of women elected into the Nigerian House of Representatives in 1983. She has served in various positions in her state including the director of Kano State's women's commission.

Life
Balarabe was born in Sierra Leone where her father was engaged in business. She attended Freetown Girls School and the Royal School for Nursing in London. In 1982, during the Second Republic, Kande became a leader of PRP's women wing in Kano. Prior to entering politics, she was a nurse in a state hospital, named the Murtala Mohammed Hospital in Kano. However, in 1982, she resigned to spend most of her time in politics. In 1983, she contested and won a seat into the Nigerian House of Representatives, however, the second republic was truncated.  In 1987, she became a member of the Constituent Assembly, representing a district in her state and was later appointed Director of the Women Commission of Kano State.

Notes

Living people
Nigerian politicians
Nigerian women activists
Year of birth missing (living people)